Andrea Capobianco (born 9 August 1966) is an Italian basketball coach of the Italian national team, which he coached at the EuroBasket Women 2017.

References

Italian basketball coaches
1966 births
Living people
Place of birth missing (living people)
21st-century Italian people